The Consensus 1996 College Basketball All-American team, as determined by aggregating the results of four major All-American teams.  To earn "consensus" status, a player must win honors from a majority of the following teams: the Associated Press, the USBWA, The United Press International and the National Association of Basketball Coaches.

1996 was the last year that the UPI teams were named.  After being considered a part of consensus selections since 1949, they would be replaced in 1998 by the Sporting News All-American team.

1996 Consensus All-America team

Individual All-America teams

AP Honorable Mention

Drew Barry, Georgia Tech
Marcus Brown, Murray State
Ace Custis, Virginia Tech
Erick Dampier, Mississippi State
Adonal Foyle, Colgate
Todd Fuller, NC State
Matt Harpring, Georgia Tech
Ronnie Henderson, LSU
Brevin Knight, Stanford
Pete Lisicky, Penn State
Marcus Mann, Mississippi Valley State
Anquell McCollum, Western Carolina
Ryan Minor, Oklahoma
Steve Nash, Santa Clara
Jeff Nordgaard, Wisconsin–Green Bay
Charles O'Bannon, UCLA
Edgar Padilla, Massachusetts
Malik Rose, Drexel
Shea Seals, Tulsa
Jess Settles, Iowa
Antoine Walker, Kentucky
Bonzi Wells, Ball State
Dedric Willoughby, Iowa State

References

NCAA Men's Basketball All-Americans
All-Americans